WWRZ (98.3 MHz) is a commercial FM radio station in Fort Meade, Florida, broadcasting to the Lakeland-Winter Haven area of Central Florida.  It broadcasts an adult hits radio format and is owned by Hall Communications.

Programming
Prior to January 2, 2006, the station was dubbed "98.3 The Rose" and had an Adult Contemporary format.  Currently, the station uses the slogan "Big Hits" with a playlist that includes new wave, pop, rock, and dance hits.  Songs from the 1970s through the 2000s are included.  Current on air personalities include co-sidekicks Eric Michaels and Mike Lee.  The rest of the schedule is largely automated, as is typical of most adult hits stations.

HD subchannels and translators
WWRZ simulcasts several stations on its HD subchannels. These subchannels are relayed by several translators.

Former logo

External links
WWRZ Official Website

Station history from Central Florida Radio

WRZ
Adult hits radio stations in the United States
Radio stations established in 1990
1990 establishments in Florida